The Stanegate (meaning "stone road" in Northumbrian dialect) was an important Roman road built in what is now northern England. It linked many forts including two that guarded important river crossings: Corstopitum (Corbridge) on the River Tyne in the east, and situated on Dere Street, and Luguvalium (Carlisle) on the River Eden in the west. The Stanegate ran through the natural gap formed by the valleys of the River Tyne in Northumberland and the River Irthing in Cumbria. It predated Hadrian's Wall by several decades; the Wall would later follow a similar route, albeit slightly to the north.

The Stanegate should not be confused with the two Roman roads called Stane Street in the south of England, namely Stane Street (Chichester) and Stane Street (Colchester). In both these cases the meaning is the same as for the northern version, indicating a stone or paved road.

The Stanegate differed from most other Roman roads in that it often followed the easiest gradients, and so tended to weave around, whereas typical Roman roads follow a straight path, even if this sometimes involves having punishing gradients to climb.

A large section of the Stanegate is still in use today as a modern minor road between Fourstones and Vindolanda in Northumberland.

History
The Stanegate is believed to have been built under the governorship of Agricola, from 77 to 85 CE, during the reigns of the emperors Vespasian, Titus, and Domitian. It is also thought that it was built as a strategic road when the northern frontier was on the line of the Forth and Clyde. An indication of this is that it was provided with forts at one-day marching intervals (14 Roman miles or modern ), sufficient for a strategic non-frontier road. The forts at Vindolanda (Chesterholm) and Nether Denton have been shown to date from about the same time as Corstopitum and Luguvalium, in the 70s and 80s CE.

When the Romans decided to withdraw from Scotland around 105 CE, the line of the Stanegate became the new frontier, and it became necessary to provide forts at half-day marching intervals. These additional forts were Newbrough, Magnis (Carvoran), and Brampton Old Church. It has been suggested that a series of smaller forts were built in between the 'half-day-march' forts. Haltwhistle Burn and Throp might be such forts, but there is insufficient evidence to confirm a series of such fortlets.

Structure

Route
The Stanegate began in the east at Corstopitum, where the important road, Dere Street headed towards Scotland. West of Corstopitum, the Stanegate crossed the Cor Burn, and then followed the north bank of the Tyne until it reached the North Tyne near the village of Wall.

From Newbrough, the Stanegate proceeds west, parallel to the South Tyne until it meets the next major fort, at Vindolanda (Chesterholm). From Vindolanda the Stanegate crosses the route of the present-day Military Road and passes just south of the minor fort of Haltwhistle Burn. At this point, the road is joined by the Maiden Way coming from Epiacum (Whitley Castle) to the south.

From Nether Denton, the road continues to follow the River Irthing and heads towards present-day Brampton. The fort is so called because half of it is buried under Old St Martin's church and its graveyard.

From Brampton Old Church, the road crosses the River Irthing and continues southwest through Irthington and passes through what is now the site of Carlisle Airport, just to the north of the main runway. The curving corner of an associated marching camp can be made out from the air on the south edge of the runway near its western end, and can be seen on Google Earth. The Stanegate then continued through a large cutting in High Crosby, where a small fort has been postulated, based on marching distances, but has not yet been found. It has been suggested that the road may have carried on west for a further  to the Roman fort at Kirkbride overlooking Moricambe Bay, an inlet of the Solway Firth.

The Stanegate might have run eastwards from Corstopitum towards Pons Aelius, present-day Newcastle upon Tyne, possibly linking to Washing Wells Roman Fort in Whickham, but no evidence has yet been found to support this.

List of forts on the Stanegate
 Corstopitum (Corbridge) (major fort)
 Newbrough (minor fort)
 Vindolanda (Chesterholm) (major fort)
 Haltwhistle Burn (minor fort)
 Magnis (Carvoran) (major fort)
 Throp, just south of Gilsland (minor fort)
 Nether Denton (major fort)
 Castle Hill Boothby, between Brampton and Lanercost Priory (minor fort)
 Brampton Old Church (major fort)
 Luguvalium (Carlisle) (major fort)

Subsequent history
Much of the Stanegate provided the foundation for the Carelgate (or Carlisle Road), a medieval road running from Corbridge market place and joining the Stanegate west of Corstopitum. The Carelgate eventually deteriorated to such an extent that it was unusable by coaches and wagons. In 1751–1752, a new Military Road was built by General George Wade in the wake of the Jacobite rising of 1745.

See also
 Hadrian's Wall
 History of Northumberland
 Roman Britain
 Roman roads in Britain

References

External links

Hadrian's Wall
History of Northumberland
History of Cumbria
Roman roads in England
Archaeological sites in Cumbria
Archaeological sites in Northumberland
Roman frontiers
Roads in Cumbria
Roads in Northumberland